Estaj (also Romanized as Estāj) is a village in Sarjam Rural District, Ahmadabad District, Mashhad County, Razavi Khorasan Province, Iran. At the 2006 census, its population was 78, in 23 families.

References 

Populated places in Mashhad County